Leen "Lee" Greenfield (July 29, 1941 – February 7, 2023) was an American politician.

Born in Brooklyn, New York, Greenfield received his bachelor's degree in physics from Purdue University. He also studied at the University of Minnesota. Greenfield was a health policy lobbyist and lived in Minneapolis, Minnesota. From 1979 to 2001, Greenfield served in the Minnesota House of Representatives and was a Democrat. From 2001 to 2008, Greenfield served as an assistant for the Hennepin County, Minnesota Board of Commissioners.

Notes

1941 births
2023 deaths
Politicians from Brooklyn
Politicians from Minneapolis
Purdue University alumni
University of Minnesota alumni
Democratic Party members of the Minnesota House of Representatives